Plagiomimicus aureolum is a species of moth in the family Noctuidae (owlet moths). It was described by Henry Edwards in 1882 and is found in North America, where it has been recorded from Arizona, western Texas and New Mexico.

The wingspan is 25–27 mm. The anterior two-thirds of the forewings are pinkish-brown, with flecks of whitish scales. The hindwings are dull fawn colour, palest at the base, with an indistinct median line.

The MONA or Hodges number for Plagiomimicus aureolum is 9741.

References

Further reading
 Lafontaine, J. Donald & Schmidt, B. Christian (2010). "Annotated check list of the Noctuoidea (Insecta, Lepidoptera) of North America north of Mexico". ZooKeys, vol. 40, 1-239.
 Arnett, Ross H. (2000). American Insects: A Handbook of the Insects of America North of Mexico. CRC Press.

External links
Butterflies and Moths of North America

Noctuidae
Moths described in 1882